The 1868 United States presidential election in Louisiana took place on November 3, 1868, as part of the 1868 United States presidential election. Voters chose seven representatives, or electors to the Electoral College, who voted for president and vice president.

Amid widespread violence and threats meant to prevent freedmen from voting, Louisiana voted for the Democratic nominee, former Governor of New York Horatio Seymour, over the Republican nominee, General Ulysses S. Grant. Seymour won the state by a margin of 41.38%.

With 70.69% of the popular vote, Louisiana would be Seymour's second strongest victory in terms of percentage in the popular vote after Kentucky.

Results

See also
 United States presidential elections in Louisiana

References

Louisiana
1868
1868 Louisiana elections